Macksville is a city in Stafford County, Kansas, United States.  As of the 2020 census, the population of the city was 471.

History
Macksville was founded about 1885. It was named for George Mack, the first postmaster of Stafford County.

Geography

Climate
The climate in this area is characterized by hot, humid summers and generally mild to cool winters.  According to the Köppen Climate Classification system, Macksville has a humid subtropical climate, abbreviated "Cfa" on climate maps.

Demographics

2010 census
As of the census of 2010, there were 549 people, 197 households, and 144 families residing in the city. The racial makeup of the city was 80.3% White, 1.3% Native American, 0.4% Asian, 16.0% from other races, and 2.0% from two or more races. Hispanic or Latino of any race were 33.7% of the population.

There were 197 households, of which 43.7% had children under the age of 18 living with them, 56.3% were married couples living together, 11.2% had a female householder with no husband present, 5.6% had a male householder with no wife present, and 26.9% were non-families. 21.3% of all households were made up of individuals, and 12.2% had someone living alone who was 65 years of age or older. The average household size was 2.79 and the average family size was 3.33.

The median age in the city was 32 years. 33% of residents were under the age of 18; 7.6% were between the ages of 18 and 24; 24% were from 25 to 44; 21.9% were from 45 to 64; and 13.5% were 65 years of age or older. The gender makeup of the city was 47.9% male and 52.1% female.

2000 census
As of the census of 2000, there were 514 people, 191 households, and 127 families residing in the city. The racial makeup of the city was 81.71% White, 1.36% Native American, 0.19% Asian, 14.59% from other races, and 2.14% from two or more races. Hispanic or Latino of any race were 23.54% of the population.

There were 191 households, out of which 38.2% had children under the age of 18 living with them, 58.1% were married couples living together, 5.8% had a female householder with no husband present, and 33.5% were non-families. 30.4% of all households were made up of individuals, and 17.3% had someone living alone who was 65 years of age or older. The average household size was 2.69 and the average family size was 3.41.

In the city, the population was spread out, with 31.9% under the age of 18, 8.0% from 18 to 24, 27.8% from 25 to 44, 15.8% from 45 to 64, and 16.5% who were 65 years of age or older. The median age was 34 years. For every 100 females, there were 94.0 males. For every 100 females age 18 and over, there were 89.2 males.

The median income for a household in the city was $30,625, and the median income for a family was $36,458. Males had a median income of $24,583 versus $18,036 for females. The per capita income for the city was $12,594. About 11.6% of families and 17.2% of the population were below the poverty line, including 24.2% of those under age 18 and 6.3% of those age 65 or over.

Education
Macksville has a high school and grade school.  The high school mascot is the Mustang.  The grade school mascot is the Colt.

References

Further reading

External links
 Macksville - Directory of Public Officials
 USD 351, local school district
 Macksville city map, KDOT

Cities in Kansas
Cities in Stafford County, Kansas